Vignola-Falesina is a comune (municipality) in Trentino in the northern Italian region Trentino-Alto Adige/Südtirol, located about  east of Trento.

Vignola-Falesina borders the following municipalities: Frassilongo, Pergine Valsugana and Levico Terme.

Demographic evolution

References

Cities and towns in Trentino-Alto Adige/Südtirol